Otopharynx argyrosoma is a species of cichlid endemic to Lake Malawi.  This species can reach a length of  TL.  This species can also be found in the aquarium trade.

References

argyrosoma
Fish described in 1922
Taxonomy articles created by Polbot